Guy Forget was the defending champion, but lost in the quarterfinals to Rodolphe Gilbert.

Andrei Medvedev won the title by defeating Sergi Bruguera 6–3, 1–6, 6–2 in the final.

Seeds

Draw

Finals

Top half

Bottom half

References

External links
 Official results archive (ATP)
 Official results archive (ITF)

1992 ATP Tour
ATP Bordeaux